Mikalai Siarheyevich Stadub is a Belarusian Greco-Roman wrestler. In 2021, he won one of the bronze medals in the 97 kg event at the 2021 European Wrestling Championships held in Warsaw, Poland.

Career 

In 2019, he lost his bronze medal match in the 87 kg event at the European Wrestling Championships held in Bucharest, Romania. He also lost his bronze medal match in the 87 kg event at the 2019 World Wrestling Championships held in Nur-Sultan, Kazakhstan.

In that year, he also competed in the 87 kg event at the 2019 Military World Games held in Wuhan, China without winning a medal.

Major results

References

External links 

 

Living people
Year of birth missing (living people)
Place of birth missing (living people)
Belarusian male sport wrestlers
European Wrestling Championships medalists
21st-century Belarusian people